Thomas E. Dayley (born February 15, 1944, in Burley, Idaho) was a Republican Idaho State Representative from 2012 to 2019 representing District 21 in the B seat. Dayley served as Idaho State Executive Director of USDA Farm Service Agency under Ronald Reagan and Donald Trump. Dayley was appointed by Speaker Scott Bedke to Idaho's Independent Redistricting Commission, after Bedke's first choice (John Simpson) was deemed ineligible due to lobbying rules.

Education
Dayley earned his BA degrees in political science and Spanish from Brigham Young University and his MA in international relations from the University of Southern California.

Elections

References

External links
Thomas Dayley at the Idaho Legislature
Thomas E. Dayley
 

1944 births
Living people
Brigham Young University alumni
Republican Party members of the Idaho House of Representatives
People from Boise, Idaho
People from Burley, Idaho
USC School of International Relations alumni
21st-century American politicians